Kathleen Ekey (born November 8, 1986) is an American female professional golfer currently playing on the LPGA Tour.

Early life
Ekey was born in Cleveland, Ohio on November 8, 1986 to Sam and Laura Ekey. She is a graduate of Walsh Jesuit High School in Cuyahoga Falls, Ohio, and was inducted into the school's athletic hall of fame in 2022.

College
Ekey played college golf for the first two years of college at Furman University, and transferred to the University of Alabama for the last two years of college.  She graduated with her bachelor's degree in Communications Studies.

Professional
Ekey turned professional in 2009, and joined the Futures Tour on July 14, 2009. In 2011, she finished at the top of the Futures Tour official money list and was named the Tour's Player of the Year.

Professional wins (2)

Futures Tour wins (2)

References

External links

American female golfers
Furman Paladins women's golfers
Alabama Crimson Tide women's golfers
LPGA Tour golfers
Golfers from Cleveland
People from Wadsworth, Ohio
1986 births
Living people